Rahul Singh Lodhi or Rahul Singh is a sitting member of the Madhya Pradesh Legislative Assembly from Khargapur constituency, since 2018. He is the nephew of former Union Minister and former Chief Minister of Madhya Pradesh Uma Bharti.

References 

1977 births
Living people
Indian Hindus
Bharatiya Janata Party politicians from Madhya Pradesh
Madhya Pradesh MLAs 2018–2023